Cut is the tenth studio album by Crack the Sky, released in 15 June 1998.

Track listing

Personnel

The band
John Palumbo — Vocals, guitar, keyboards
John Tracey — Drums, backing vocals
Cary Ziegler — Bass guitar
Bobby Hird — Guitar, backing vocals
Rick Witkowski — Guitar
Ron Zebron — Guitar

1998 albums
Crack the Sky albums